Browntown is an unincorporated community located within Old Bridge Township in Middlesex County, New Jersey, United States. The area is served as United States Postal Service ZIP code 08857.

As of the 2000 United States Census, the population for ZIP Code Tabulation Area 08857 was 36,142.

Notable people
People who were born in, residents of, or otherwise closely associated with Browntown include:
William H. Sutphin (1887–1972) represented  1931–1943.

References

External links

Census 2000 Fact Sheet for ZIP Code Tabulation Area 08857 from the United States Census Bureau

Old Bridge Township, New Jersey
Unincorporated communities in Middlesex County, New Jersey
Unincorporated communities in New Jersey